Lambert Ehrlich (18 September 1878 – 26 May 1942) was a Carinthian Slovene Roman Catholic priest, political figure, and ethnologist.

Early life and education
Ehrlich was born in the hamlet of Seifnitz in the Canal Valley in the town of Tarvisio, then part of the Duchy of Carinthia (now Camporosso in Italy). He attended secondary school in Klagenfurt and then studied theology in Innsbruck (1897–1902) and in Rome (1903). He was ordained a priest in 1903 and also received a doctorate in Innsbruck that year.

Work
Ehrlich first served as a curate in Villach, and then as a cathedral curate in Klagenfurt (1903–1907), an episcopal secretary (1907–1910), and a professor of theology in the University of Klagenfurt (1910–1919). He was a leading figure in Catholic education in Carinthia.

After World War I, southern Carinthia became a contested region between the Austrian Republic and the Kingdom of Serbs, Croats and Slovenes; because of his familiarity with the situation in the region and his ethnographic knowledge, Ehrlich was appointed to the Yugoslav delegation to the Paris Peace Conference in 1919. He continued his studies in ethnology and comparative religion at the Sorbonne and in Oxford in 1920 and 1921. In 1922 he became a full professor of comparative religion at the Faculty of Theology of the University of Ljubljana, a position that he held until his death. He wrote numerous books and articles about the religious customs of the Australian Aborigines and about various ethnological and theological issues.

Ehrlich worked in various church organizations. He was a church representative for the Slovenian High School Students’ Union, the Academic Union, the Straža Catholic students’ club, and the Marian Congregation of Academics. He became the ideologue of the Straža club and edited the club’s magazine Straža v viharju (Sentinel in the Storm). The club and its Straža magazine achieved notoriety for its admiration of fascism, as well as antisemitism, equating Jews with both western capitalist excesses and the Bolshevik revolution

Second World War
After the invasion of Yugoslavia in April 1941, on 24 November that year Ehrlich proposed a political program known as the Slovenian Issue for an independent Slovenian state to the non-communist political parties; however, it was not accepted.

Ehrlich was a staunch anti-communist, anti-fascist and anti-Semite. During the war he campaigned against "Jewish Satanism"  which he maintained was trying to get its hands on other people's national treasuries. On 1 April 1942 he sent the Italian occupation authorities a memorandum in which he analyzed the current position of the Partisans and offered proposals for how to destroy them. In it, he suggested that the Italians arm the Slovenian police and that the Slovenians establish a semi-autonomous security service under Italian military supervision. He also suggested that the Italian authorities release innocent people held in prisons and camps, assist in rebuilding destroyed villages, and allow greater freedom of the press to promote anti-communist propaganda.

Ehrlich was assassinated by the communist Security and Intelligence Service on 26 May 1942. He was shot in front of the soup kitchen on Shooting Range Street in Ljubljana by Franc Stadler (a.k.a. Pepe) (1915–2000), who also assassinated Marko Natlačen and was named a Yugoslav People’s Hero. After the war the Communist authorities desecrated Ehrlich’s grave, exhumed his remains, and disposed of them at an unknown location.

Bibliography 
Svete Višarje. Klagenfurt: Slovenska kršč.-soc. “Zveza” za Koroško, 1910 
Dr. Aigner und Lourdes. Klagenfurt: Schriftleitung des “Kärntner Tagblattes,” 1914 
Katoliška Cerkev, kraljestvo božje na zemlji. Klagenfurt: Družba sv. Mohorja, 1919-1927 
La question du Prekmurje, de la Styrie et de la Carinthie. La Carinthie; Paris: Imprimerie “Graphique”, 1919 (coauthor) 
Origin of Australian Beliefs. St. Gabriel - Mödling (Vienna): Anthropos administration, 1922 
Slovenska misijonarja Baraga in Knoblehar. Ljubljana: “Unio Cleri,” 1928 
Razvoj etnologije in njene metode v zadnjih desetletjih = Le développement de l'ethnologie et ses méthodes au dernier temps. Ljubljana, 1929 
Na sveti poti: višarski molitvenik. Gorizia: Svetovišarsko svetišče, 1931 
Indijske šole. Ljubljana: Bengalski misijon D. J., 1938 
Parijci. Ljubljana: Bengalski misijon D. J., 1939 
Apologetika: osnovno bogoslovje. Ljubljana: author, 193? 
Lambert Ehrlich: Pariška mirovna konferenca in Slovenci 1919/20 / Ehrlichova spomenica za Vatikan 14. aprila 1942. Lambert Ehrlich za slovenski narod. Ljubljana: Inštitut za zgodovino Cerkve pri Teološki fakulteti Univerze, 2002 
 Luca Pignataro, La Slovenia tra primo Novecento e secondo dopoguerra, in “Nuova Storia Contemporanea”, XIII, 1(2009), pp. 11–30 (Italian)

References

1878 births
1942 deaths
20th-century Slovenian Roman Catholic priests
Academic staff of the University of Klagenfurt
Slovenian politicians
Slovenian anti-communists
Yugoslav anti-communists
Slovenian civilians killed in World War II
Slovenian collaborators with Fascist Italy
University of Innsbruck alumni
Academic staff of the University of Ljubljana
Slovenian ethnologists
Slovenian theologians
Assassinated religious leaders
Assassinated Yugoslav people
Slovenian Servants of God
Burials at Žale
People from the Province of Udine